The Noel Diary is a 2022 American Christmas romantic comedy-drama film directed by Charles Shyer and written by Rebecca Connor, David Golden, Charles Shyer, and Richard Paul Evans. The film stars Justin Hartley, Barrett Doss, Bonnie Bedelia, Essence Atkins, and James Remar. 

The Noel Diary was released on November 24, 2022, by Netflix.

Plot
When popular author Jake Turner comes back home at Christmas to settle his estranged mother's estate, he discovers a diary that may hold information related to his past and that of Rachel, an interesting young woman on a journey of her own. Rachel shows up at the same time in search of information about her birth mother, Noel, who used to be Jake's nanny. Noel was 17 at the time of Rachel's birth and had to give up her child, as she could not afford to take care of her. Jake and Rachel embark on a journey together to challenge their pasts and discover a future that is totally unforeseen.

Cast
 Justin Hartley as Jake Turner
 Barrett Doss as Rachel Campbell
 Essence Atkins as Noel Ellis
 Bonnie Bedelia as Ellie Foster
 James Remar as Scott Turner
 Aaron Costa Ganis as Matt Segreto
 Jeff Corbett as Ian Page
 Andrea Sooch as Svetlana
 Lucia Spina as book store owner

Reception

See also
 List of Christmas films

References

External links
 
 

2022 romantic comedy-drama films
2020s American films
2020s Christmas comedy-drama films
2020s English-language films
American Christmas comedy-drama films
American romantic comedy-drama films
English-language Netflix original films
Films based on American novels
Films set in Connecticut
Films shot in Connecticut